Creekside Christian Academy is a private non-denominational Christian school located in McDonough, Georgia. It conducts classes for preschool as well as elementary, middle school, and high school grades.

In January 2018, Creekside moved its high school students to a new campus known as the West Campus, making the school a dual campus academy. The West Campus located at 2455 Mt. Carmel Rd. in Hampton Georgia, was the former home of Higher Living Christian Church. The church recently has been evicted due to foreclosure. The middle school students of CCA are planning to move over into the West Campus in the Fall of 2018. The elementary and preschool portion of the school with remain at the East Campus (175 Foster Drive Mcdonough Georgia) In 1973, it used to be Clayton Christian School and moved into East Campus 2007.

References

1973 establishments in Georgia (U.S. state)
Christian schools in Georgia (U.S. state)
Educational institutions established in 1973
Nondenominational Christian schools in the United States
Private elementary schools in Georgia (U.S. state)
Private middle schools in Georgia (U.S. state)
Private high schools in Georgia (U.S. state)
Schools in Henry County, Georgia